Vesna Čipčić (born 23 March 1954) is a Serbian actress. She was born in Belgrade and is mother of actress .

Filmography

Džangrizalo (1976) as hotel maid
Dva drugara (1976)
Prvi garnizon (1976)
Ljubav u jedanaestoj (1978)
Kod Kamile as Kelnerica Rozika (1978)
Sećam se (1979)
Žestoke godine (1979)
Avanture Borivoja Šurdilovića (1980) as Vesna Šurdilović
Tren (1980)
Sedam plus sedam as Vesna (1980)
Vruć vetar as Vesna Šurdilović (1980)
Samo za dvoje as Stjuardica Katarina (1981)
Ljubi, ljubi, al' glavu ne gubi as Elza (1981)
Kraljevski voz as Rule (1981)
Pop Ćira i pop Spira as Melanija (1982)
Kakav deda takav unuk as Elza (1982)
Timočka buna (1983)
Idi mi, dodji mi (1983) as Elza
Ubi ili poljubi (1984)
Šta se zgodi kad se ljubav rodi (1984)
Memed My Hawk (film) (1984)
Nema problema as nurse (1984)
Žikina dinastija (1985)
Tombola (1985)
Ada as Vojka (1985)
Sekula i njegove žene (1986)
Ne znate vi Martina (1986)
Osveta as Jelena (1986)
Mister Dolar (1989)
Žikina ženidba as Elza (1992)
Three Tickets to Hollywood as teacher (1993)
Pokondirena tikva (1996)
Nikoljdan 1901. godine as Jovanka (1998)
Zajedničko putovanje (2001)
M(j)ešoviti brak as Vanja (2003)
O štetnosti duvana (2004)
Od danas do sutra (2006)
Krv nije voda (2008)
Professor Kosta Vujić's Hat (2012)

External links
 

1954 births
Living people
Actresses from Belgrade
Serbian television actresses
20th-century Serbian actresses
21st-century Serbian actresses